Major General Ronald Walton Urquhart CB DSO (26 March 1906 – 19 April 1968) was a British Army officer who became Commandant of the Royal Military Academy Sandhurst.

Early life 
Urquhart was the son of W. L. A. W. Urquhart, Esq, of Montevideo, Uruguay. He was educated at Bedford School and at Pembroke College, Cambridge. He then attended the Royal Military Academy, Woolwich, earning the rank of Senior Under Officer. He was also awarded the Sword of Honour. He finished his young officer coursework at Chatham and at Pembroke College.

Military career
He was commissioned into the Royal Engineers in 1925. In the Second World War he served in Norway and North West Europe, being awarded the DSO for his services in Normandy. After the War he became Director of Combined Operations and then, from 1953, Commander of 35th Infantry Brigade.

He went on to be Chief of Staff at Western Command in 1956 and Commandant of the Royal Military Academy Sandhurst between 1957 and 1960.

Personal life 
He married Jean Moir in 1945 and had children David and Jane. He died on 19 April 1968.

References

1906 births
1968 deaths
British Army major generals
People educated at Bedford School
Alumni of Pembroke College, Cambridge
Graduates of the Royal Military Academy, Woolwich
Royal Engineers officers
Companions of the Order of the Bath
Companions of the Distinguished Service Order
Commandants of Sandhurst
British Army personnel of World War II